Hsieh Ming-yuan (born 3 September 1952) is a Taiwanese politician.

Education
Hsieh graduated from National Chung Hsing University with a degree in business.

Political career
Hsieh led the Taichung chapter of the Democratic Progressive Party and served two terms on the Taichung City Council from 1994 to 2002. He helped run the legislative campaigns of Michael Tsai and led presidential candidate Chen Shui-bian's Taichung campaign in 2000. Hsieh was elected to the Legislative Yuan for the first time in December 2001 and reelected in December 2004. He lost reelection in 2008 and later ended his 2009 Taichung mayoral campaign, allowing Lin Chia-lung to represent the Democratic Progressive Party. Hsieh launched another legislative campaign in 2012 before winning a Taichung municipal election in 2014.

References

1952 births
Living people
National Chung Hsing University alumni
Taichung Members of the Legislative Yuan
Members of the 5th Legislative Yuan
Members of the 6th Legislative Yuan
Democratic Progressive Party Members of the Legislative Yuan
Politicians of the Republic of China on Taiwan from Kaohsiung
Taichung City Councilors